Matt Symonds (born 9 December 1968) is a British entrepreneur and author.

Career
Symonds is founder of the QS World MBA Tour, an international organiser of business school events in over 40 countries, and MD of the graduate education consultancy, SymondsGSB. He is co-author with Alain de Mendonca of the bestselling guide to business schools, ABC of Getting the MBA Admissions Edge, sponsored by Goldman Sachs and McKinsey & Co.

In 1995, he founded the business school event Euro MBA Tour, organising a Paris Fair to introduce business schools to potential MBA applicants. In 1998, he partnered with Nunzio Quacquarelli, editor of the TopMBA Career Guide to create the QS World MBA Tour.

The Euro MBA Tour operates in over 40 countries, attracting more than 60,000 visitors every year to meet with 380 business schools. Participating business schools include UC Berkeley Haas School of Business, Cambridge Judge Business School, Ceibs, Chicago GSB, Columbia Business School, Cornell S.C. Johnson Graduate School of Management, Duke Fuqua School of Business, EM Lyon, ESADE, Harvard Business School, HEC, HKUST, IE, IESE, IMD, INSEAD, Kellogg School of Management Northwestern, London Business School, New York University Stern School of Business, Oxford Saïd Business School, Rotterdam School of Management, Tuck School of Business, UNC Kenan-Flagler Business School, UCLA Anderson School of Management, Univ. Michigan Ross School of Business, Univ. Virginia Darden School, Wharton School, Vlerick Leuven Gent Management School and the Yale SOM.

Publications
Symonds contributes to a number of international publications on business education and management, including The Economist, BusinessWeek, Forbes, The Times, Handelsblatt, and The Independent.

References

External links
 TopMBA
 

1968 births
British businesspeople
Living people